George Victor Claude Jackson (9 April 1889 – 28 December 1959) was an Australian rules footballer who played with Collingwood in the Victorian Football League (VFL).

Notes

External links 

Victor Jackson's profile at Collingwood Forever

1889 births
1959 deaths
Australian rules footballers from Victoria (Australia)
Collingwood Football Club players
Castlemaine Football Club players